The 1998 FIA GT Championship was the second season of FIA GT Championship, an auto racing series endorsed by the Fédération Internationale de l'Automobile (FIA) and organized by the Stéphane Ratel Organisation (SRO). The races featured grand touring cars conforming to two categories of regulations, GT1 and GT2, and awarded driver and team championships in each category.  The season began on 12 April 1998 and ended on 25 October 1998 after ten rounds, visiting Europe, Japan, and the United States.

The GT1 championships were won by Klaus Ludwig and Ricardo Zonta of repeat champions AMG Mercedes, while the GT2 title was awarded to Olivier Beretta and Pedro Lamy of Viper Team Oreca.  Following the season, the GT1 category was eliminated from the FIA GT Championship due to a lack of entries for 1999.

Schedule
All races were shortened to a  distance with the exception of Suzuka.  Oschersleben replaced the Nürburgring as the second German round of the series, while Hungaroring and Dijon-Prenois replaced Mugello, Spa, and Helsinki for the rest of the European calendar.

Entries

GT1

GT2

Results and standings

Race results

Points were awarded to the top six finishers in each category.  Entries were required to complete 75% of the race distance in order to be classified as a finisher.  Drivers were required to complete 20% of the total race distance for their car to earn points.  Teams scored points for all cars that finished a race.

Driver championships

GT1

GT2

Team championships

GT1

GT2

References

See also
 GTR Euroseries

FIA GT Championship
FIA GT Championship seasons